Srebrna krila are a Croatian pop-rock band from Zagreb that are popular across the ex-Yugoslav states.

The band was created in 1978, with Vlado Kalember as the lead singer. Most of their Kalember-era hits were written by Đorđe Novković.

In 1988 the band represented Yugoslavia at the Eurovision Song Contest with the song "Mangup", placing at number 6.

Throughout the 1980s and 1990s the band went through a series of different incarnations. Kalember left the band after their 1986 album 30 u hladu. The band  disappeared for several years after the death of its leader Muc in 2000.

Srebrna krila reunited on 1 June 2012 and announced the return to the scene.

At the end of August 2012 they announced a new comeback album called "Srebrna Krila 2012".

Members of the group
 Vlado Kalember: vocals, bass guitar (1978–1987, 2012–present)
 Dado Jelavić: guitars (1978–1981, 1983–1988, 2012–present)
 Adi Karaselimović: drums (1978–1981)
 Duško Mandić: guitars (1978–1984)
 Mustafa "Muc" Ismailovski: keyboards (1979–2000)
 Slavko Pintarić Pišta: drums (1981–1994, 2012–present)
 Lidija Asanović: vocals (1987–1989)
 Oleg Colnago: bass guitar (1987–1989)
 Vlatka Pokos: vocals (1989–1994)
 Vlatka Grakalić: vocals (1994–2000)
 Barbara Vujević: vocals (1994–1996)
 Daniel Popović: guitars (1981, 5 days)
 Minea: vocals (1994)

Discography
 Srebrna Krila (1979)
 Ja sam samo jedan od mnogih sa gitarom (1980)
 Sreo sam ljubav iz prve pjesme (1980)
 Ša-la-la (1981)
 Julija i Romeo (compilation) (1982)
 Zadnja ploča (1982)
 Silverwings (English version of "Zadnja ploča", Canada, 1983)
 Ćao amore (Vlado, Izolda & Srebrna krila, 1983)
 Djevuška (1983)
 Uspomene (1984)
 Nek' živi ljubav – za djecu (1984)
 30 u hladu (1986)
 Mangup (1988)
 Poleti golubice (1988)
 Zašto nisam miljenica sudbine (1991)
 Ljubi me noćas (1994)
 Ljubav je za ljude sve (maxi single, 1995)
 O kako ludo se osjećam (Licensed edition in Slovenia, 1995)
 Tamo gdje ljubav stanuje (1996)
 Nebo vidi, nebo zna (1998)
 Mega hitova Srebrnih krila (1998)
 Zlatna kolekcija (2001)
 Platinum Collection (2006)
 Srebrna krila 2012 (2012)

External links
 Srebrna krila at Croatia Records 
 THE PLATINUM COLLECTION SREBRNA KRILA, INTERVJU 

Musical groups established in 1978
Croatian rock music groups
Eurovision Song Contest entrants for Yugoslavia
Eurovision Song Contest entrants of 1988
Croatian pop music groups
Musical groups disestablished in 2000